Juana Muñoz-Liceras is Professor of Hispanic and General Linguistics in the Department of Modern Languages and Literatures at the University of Ottawa, Ottawa, Canada. Her main research focus on the acquisition of Spanish as a Second Language as well theoretical linguistics and language contact. She was recognized as one of the 10 most influential Hispanics of 2013 in Canada.

Publications
 Markedness, contrastive analysis and the acquisition of Spanish syntax by English speakers, 1983
 Linguistic theory and second language acquisition : the Spanish nonnative grammar of English speakers, 1986
 La adquisición de las lenguas segundas y la gramática universal,1996
 The role of formal features in second language acquisition, 2007

References 

Living people
Academic staff of the University of Ottawa
Year of birth missing (living people)